Pierre Lemaitre (born 19 April 1951) is a Prix Goncourt-winning French author and a screenwriter, internationally renowned for the crime novels featuring the fictional character Commandant Camille Verhœven.

His first novel to be translated into English, Alex, is a translation of the French book of the same title, it jointly won the CWA International Dagger for best translated crime novel of 2013.

In November 2013, he was awarded the Prix Goncourt, France's top literary prize, for Au revoir là-haut (published in English as The Great Swindle), an epic about World War I.  His novels Camille and The Great Swindle won the CWA International Dagger in 2015 and 2016 respectively.

Personal life
Pierre Lemaitre worked as a teacher in literature and now devotes his time writing novels and screenplays.

Bibliography

Novels 

Camille Verhœven series:
 Irene (Travail soigné) (2006), English translation by Frank Wynne, 2014
 Alex (2011), English translation by Frank Wynne, 2013
 Les Grands Moyens (2011), reissued in 2013 as Rosy & John
 Camille (Sacrifices) (2012), English translation by Frank Wynne, 2015

Les Enfants du désastre trilogy:
 The Great Swindle (Au revoir là-haut) (2013), English translation by Frank Wynne, 2015
 All Human Wisdom (Couleurs de l'incendie) (2018), English translation 2021
 Mirror of our Sorrows (Miroir de nos peines) (2020), English translation 2022

Les Années Glorieuses, tetralogy:

1. The Great World (Le Grand Monde) (February 2022)

Stand-alones:
 Blood Wedding (Robe de marié) (2009), English translation by Frank Wynne, 2016
 Inhuman Resources (Cadres noirs) (2010), English translation: by Sam Gordon, 2018
 Three Days and a Life (Trois jours et une vie) (2016), English translation by Frank Wynne, 2017
 The Great Snake (Le Serpent majuscule) (2021), English translation: 2022

Short stories 

 "Une initiative" (2014)
 "Les Événements de Péronne" (2018)

Comics 

Les Enfants du désastre series:
 Au revoir là-haut (2016), with Christian De Metter

Camille Verhœven series (with Pascal Bertho, illustrated by Yannick Corboz):
 Irene (2019), based on novel Irene
 Rosie (2018), based on novel Rosy & John

Non-fiction 

 Savoir apprendre (1986), with François Maquere, guide
 Dictionnaire amoureux du polar (2020), literature

Awards and honours
Travail soigné
2006 Prix du premier roman du festival de Cognac, Travail soigné
2009 Prix des lectrices Confidentielles, Travail soigné
2009 Prix Sang d'encre et Prix des lecteurs Goutte de Sang d'encre, Vienne, Travail soigné
2009 Prix du polar francophone de Montigny les Cormeilles, Travail soigné
Cadres noirs
2010 Prix Le Point du polar européen, Cadres noirs
Alex
2012 Prix des lecteurs policier du Livre de poche, Alex
2013 CWA International Dagger, Alex (translated by Frank Wynne)
Au revoir là-haut
2013 Prix des libraires de Nancy Le Point, Au revoir là-haut
2013 Roman français préféré des libraires à la Rentrée, Au revoir là-haut
2013 Prix Goncourt, Au revoir là-haut
2016 CWA International Dagger, The Great Swindle (translated by Frank Wynne)
Camille
2015 CWA International Dagger, Camille (translated by Frank Wynne)

Adaptations 

 See You Up There (2017), film directed by Albert Dupontel, based on novel The Great Swindle
 Three Days and a Life (2019), film directed by Nicolas Boukhrief, based on novel Three Days and a Life
 Inhuman Resources (2020), miniseries directed by Ziad Doueiri, based on novel Inhuman Resources

References

External links 

 
 Review, Irene
 

1951 births
Living people
20th-century French male writers
21st-century French male writers
20th-century French novelists
21st-century French novelists
French male novelists
French male screenwriters
French screenwriters
Prix Goncourt winners
Writers from Paris